Charles Bryant may refer to:

 Charles Bryant (actor) (1879–1948), British actor
 Charles David Jones Bryant (1883–1937), Australian artist
 Charles Ernest William Bryant (1902–1960), Australian barrister and ornithologist
 Charles Gyude Bryant (born 1949), Liberian politician
 Charles G. Bryant (1803–1850), architect, soldier, adventurer, and American expansionist
 Charles I. Bryant (1929–2005), African American architect
 Charles W. "Chuck" Bryant (born 1971), American podcaster and co-host of Stuff You Should Know